Gabriel Sebastián "Gabri" Cardozo Tomás (born 27 December 1997) is an Uruguayan footballer who plays as a central defender for Spanish club UD Montijo.

Club career
Born in Montevideo, Cardozo moved to Cádiz, Andalusia at early age, and joined Málaga CF's youth setup in 2013, aged 15. He made his senior debut with the reserves on 28 August 2016, starting in a 1–0 Tercera División home win against UD Ciudad de Torredonjimeno.

Cardozo scored his first senior goal on 11 September 2016, netting his team's second in a 4–1 home routing of UD Maracena. The following 31 August, after featuring sparingly, he moved to another reserve team, Real Oviedo Vetusta also in the fourth division.

On 23 August 2018, Cardozo joined Extremadura UD and was assigned to the B-side also in the fourth tier. He made his first team debut on 12 July 2020, coming on as a late substitute for Sabit Abdulai in a 3–2 away defeat of Deportivo de La Coruña in the Segunda División championship.

On 2 October 2020, Cardozo moved to another reserve team, CF Pobla de Mafumet also in division four.

Personal life
Cardozo's father Gerardo was also a footballer. He is also the godson of Walter Pandiani.

References

External links
 
 
 

1997 births
Living people
Footballers from Montevideo
Uruguayan emigrants to Spain
Uruguayan footballers
Association football defenders
Segunda División players
Segunda Federación players
Tercera División players
Atlético Malagueño players
Real Oviedo Vetusta players
Extremadura UD B players
Extremadura UD footballers
CF Pobla de Mafumet footballers